The 1932 Utah gubernatorial election was held on November 8, 1932. Democratic nominee Henry H. Blood defeated Republican nominee William W. Seegmiller with 56.39% of the vote.

General election

Candidates
Major party candidates
Henry H. Blood, Democratic
William W. Seegmiller, Republican 

Other candidates
A.L. Porter, Socialist
Marvin P. Bales, Communist

Results

References

1932
Utah
Gubernatorial